Francis Anthony Sponberg (18 May 1913 − 17 June 2000) was a professional rugby league footballer who played for Western Suburbs, Canterbury-Bankstown and for the New South Wales Rugby League team. He is the younger brother of Bill Sponberg - who also played for Canterbury.

Club career
Of Swedish descent, Sponberg had a very successful club career, ultimately winning three grand finals with two different clubs.

A Canterbury junior, Sponberg made his debut for Western Suburbs in Round 6 of the 1932 season. He played for Wests for three seasons between 1932 and 1934. Sponberg played in the final against South Sydney after a semi-final win against Balmain. However, as minor premiers, Souths were allowed right of challenge, and so a rematch of the grand final was played a week later. Western Suburbs lost the grand final 12-19 and Souths took their 11th title. He scored his debut try in round 11 of the 1932 season in a win against Sydney University.

Sponberg played lock in the 1934 Grand Final, with his team defeating Eastern Suburbs 15-12.

He joined the newly admitted Canterbury-Bankstown club for their debut season in 1935. He played a total of 8 seasons with Canterbury between 1935 and 1944, including the 1938 Grand Final and the 1942 Grand Final. He spent the 1940 season as captain-coach of Wollongong, before returning to Canterbury in 1941. In round 4 of 1941, Sponberg scored two tries against South Sydney. In Canterbury's season rematch with Souths, Sponberg also scored two tries to help his team win 16-13.

In 1944, Sponberg played his final career game in round 8 against Newtown. He scored a try in that game.

Representative career
Sponberg represented New South Wales on 7 occasions between 1933 and 1935. He scored a try in New South Wales' 24-0 Game 1 win against Queensland in the 1933 Interstate series. He missed 1936 selection due to broken ribs. Sponberg also represented New South Wales City, making 4 appearances with thffe representative team. In his debut with the team, he scored 2 tries against New South Wales Country, with his team winning 47-6.

Sponberg died at his home on the Central Coast of New South Wales following a short illness on 17 June 2000, aged 87.

Accolades
During 1936, Sponberg was quoted in the press as "the next best lock to Wally Prigg in Australia."

In 1985, Sponberg was selected in the Bulldog's 'Greatest Team Ever'.

In 2004, Sponberg was named in the Canterbury 70th year Berries to Bulldogs Team Of Champions as lock forward.

In 2007, he was inducted into the Bulldogs Ring of Champions (Hall of Fame).

References

1913 births
2000 deaths
Australian rugby league players
Australian people of Swedish descent
Western Suburbs Magpies players
Canterbury-Bankstown Bulldogs players
Rugby league players from Sydney
Rugby league locks
Rugby league second-rows